Shekinah Jacob (Auckland) is a playwright based in New Zealand who trained with the Royal Court Theatre, London. Her plays include Ali.J, The Long Way Home produced by Evam Entertainment, the musical Queen of Hearts that toured India and the Middle East, and a monologue titled We are Water on BBC radio. Ali.J, which opened at the Fringe festival in Edinburgh received a four-star review from The Scotsman. Her latest play Kitchdi Tales was developed in Melbourne and was shortlisted for the Auckland Arts Festival. Jacob holds a Masters in Writing for Performance from the University of London as a Charles Wallace scholar, and a PhD in theatre from the University of Victoria.

Shekinah runs the New Zealand and Bangalore-based theatre company Open House Productions that has performed over 60 shows of short plays for churches, conferences, and corporate institutions in both India and New Zealand, as well as in the Middle East.

Early life
Jacob said in an interview in The Hindu, 14 September 2013, that playwriting came naturally to her when she was a child. She won a national short story writing competition at school. In her high school in Vellore, Ida Scudder School, she wrote a musical for the annual play production, finding it easier to write one than to find an appropriate play in the library as her principal had initially suggested.

She graduated from Women's Christian College, Chennai. As an all women's college, they had no male actors and so Jacob wrote a play titled Seven for a Secret that had an all-women cast. It won the Best Script prize and the Best Audience Response at an inter-collegiate theatre festival.

She worked as a reporter in Bangalore doing food and play reviews. She then did an MA in English Literature at the University of Madras. She worked as a copywriter and then as a technical writer.

Plays

Jacob wrote her second full-length script while studying at Women's Christian College. But she learnt the fundamentals of playwriting during a workshop by Mahesh Dattani and was later trained by the Royal Court Theatre in London.She says about her experience in her interview with 'The Hindu' "I learnt how drama is action. Cause and effect. Your left brain and right brain have to work together.”
 
In WCC she had to write a play with no male actors in it. So she wrote a play with 7 girls in it, Seven for a Secret, and it was this play that got her into a workshop with the Royal Court Theatre, London. The play was performed in Chennai and it won the Best Script prize and Best Audience Response prize.

She participated in a playwriting workshop by Mahesh Dattani and the play she wrote at the end of this Only Women, had a rehearsed reading at the British Council.

She also wrote a monologue, We are Water that was aired on BBC radio in September 2003.

After taking up various other jobs, she realised that she wanted to work in theatre, especially writing scripts, so she approached the Royal Court Theatre again. This time she sent them a play that she had been working on. It was the original draft of The Long Way Home. This was performed at the NCPA, Prithvi in Mumbai and the Museum Theatre in Chennai.

Her play Ali J began with a real story. Her brother is a lawyer who works with a human rights organisation in Mumbai. He told her about a young man who was imprisoned because drugs were planted in his bag. The man spent 10 years in a Mauritius prison, and then was moved to Mumbai. He's still in prison. Around the same time, she was asked to write a monologue for the Edinburgh Festival Fringe. "They originally wanted one on Muhammad Ali Jinnah, and realizing how little Indian history she knew, she began to read extensively on the subject." After six months of reading, she decided to morph the two subjects. "The actual writing took just as long as it took her to type." The play premiered at the Edinburgh Fringe Festival and ran for 25 days. It will open the NCPA Centrestage Festival in Mumbai next, after which it will tour the country.

Talking about her inspiration in her interview with "The Indian Express" on 25 October 2013 Jacob says, "I read as widely as possible– my favorite playwrights include Alan Bennett for the brilliant way in which he captures miniature shifts of mood and the textured dynamics of relationships, also Tom Stoppard and David Mamet. And of course the immortal Shakespeare," she says. According to Jacob, good theatre is like a good democracy, 'by the people, of the people, and for the people'. She writes what she would like to watch as an audience. She enjoys watching plays that are rooted in her world. Theatre should be like an ongoing dialogue between the audience and the actors.

Shekinah Jacob began her own theatre group called Open House Productions, mainly to combine her two loves- entertaining, thought-provoking theatre that also generates income for charitable causes. The uniqueness of this theatre company is that operates on a Robin Hood model, funded by corporates and well-wishers, while most of the revenue from ticket sales go to deserving local NGOs in every locality that they perform in.

Open House Productions feel that artists should be rewarded for their time and talent and they try to pay every performer as generously as possible. 

In an interview in 2015, playwright Naren Weiss told India-West that his play Censored came to him after Jacob's Ali J had been banned in multiple cities across India. The play was later shot as a sketch by the Stray Factory and went viral in India.

Play Ali J
Part Bollywood romance, part social commentary on the after-effects of the partitioning of India, this perfectly pitched play by Shekinah Jacob, produced by Evam Theatre, never lets the weighty issues it tackles overshadow a heartfelt personal story. The writing is rich with humour and humanity, and TK Karthik's engaging performance brings Ali's warm and welcoming character to life.

The Scotsman  – "Hot show pick..." 4 stars

The play is both heartfelt and cerebral as it paints a picture of an India still living in the wake of brutal partition following independence, simultaneously telling the story of one man and millions of people. The writing is never simplistic but always open, and uttered with a joy of life that can only come to those facing death. Sublime.

Three Weeks -"Heartfelt and Cerebral" – 5 stars

No Borders – "Beautifully written script ... Excellent performance" – 4 stars

The Stage – "Impressive demanding performance"

Fringe Review -"Highly recommended show"

The National, Fest – 'It's a powerful, often surprisingly humorous production, astutely illustrating the emotional shifts such a character can undergo, from naive hope to radical intensity. Our emotions become heavily entwined with a figure who, if he chooses a particular path, would be widely demonised. It raises intriguing questions" – Sir Hawkins, The National, Fest, Independent.co.uk

WhatsOnStage – Top 18 picks of the Edinburgh Fringe

Asian Age -Mention of Indian Element at the Fringe

British Theatre Guide –  "A rarity ... unique" – 3 stars

Works
Ali J – Premiered at the Edinburgh Fringe Festival for a three-week run in August 2013 as a Richard Jordan and Evam Entertainment Production.
The Long Way Home – Produced by Evam Entertainment and directed by Karthik Kumar, with shows at Mumbai, Chennai & Bangalore.
We are water – This monologue was aired on BBC radio in Sept 2003.
Seven For a Secret – Won the Best Script prize and Best Audience Response prize at an inter-collegiate theatre festival
Only Women- this had a rehearsed reading in the British Council.
Goeing 747 – A comic re-telling of the Christmas story, which played to appreciative audiences in 2012

References

Indian women dramatists and playwrights
Living people
Writers from Chennai
Year of birth missing (living people)